Andy Parker is a British illustrator of children's books. His work includes Art Fraud Detective, written by Anna Nilsen, which made the shortlist for the 2005 Blue Peter Book Awards, Best Book with Facts.

Parker also worked on Brothers: A Hebrew Legend, with Florence B. Freedman. They jointly won the National Jewish Book Award for Children's Picture Book in 1986.

References

External links

 
 Oxford Reading Tree
 
  

British children's book illustrators
Living people
Year of birth missing (living people)
Place of birth missing (living people)